Ohdutsumi Dam is an earthfill dam located in Akita Prefecture in Japan. The dam is used for irrigation. The catchment area of the dam is 1.6 km2. The dam impounds about 6  ha of land when full and can store 273 thousand cubic meters of water. The construction of the dam was  completed in 1921.

References

Dams in Akita Prefecture
1921 establishments in Japan